The New Balance 99X Series is a series of athletic shoes produced by New Balance since the introduction of the first New Balance 990 in 1982. The shoes have been updated sporadically since the original 990 — all models have used the 99X numbering format and some model numbers have been reused throughout the years.

Recognition
On the 30th anniversary of the shoe in 2012, the New York Times reported, "The 990 has a cult following: according to New Balance officials, it was favored by Steve Jobs, and has also been worn by the actors Ben Affleck, Jennifer Garner and Hilary Duff. Forbes, BBC and other media also reported how Jobs wore the shoes frequently. 

Design of the 990 in 2012 was led by New Balance Senior Designer Andrew Nyssen.

Series history
Most of the information on the early models of the 99X Series is available on two New Balance promotional histories of the series in video format.

 New Balance 990 – 1982
 New Balance 995 – 1986
 New Balance 996 – 1988/1989
 New Balance 997 – 1990/1991
 New Balance 998 – 1993
 New Balance 999 – 1996
 New Balance 990v2 – 1998
 New Balance 991 – 2001
 New Balance 992 – 2006
 New Balance 993 – 2008
 New Balance 990v3 – 2012
 New Balance 990v4 – 2016
 New Balance 990v5 – 2019
 New Balance 990v6 – 2022

References

External links
PK Shoes & Sneakers
Types Of Athletic Shoes

New Balance